Bustin is a surname. Notable people with the surname include:

Beverly Bustin (born 1936), American politician from Maine
Debra Bustin (born 1957), artist from New Zealand
G. T. Bustin (1903–1995), American preacher, pastor, evangelist and missionary
Pamela Bustin (born 1967), former field hockey defender from the United States
Stephen Bustin (born 1954), British scientist, professor of molecular sciences at Queen Mary University of London 2004–2012

See also
Bust (disambiguation)
Busti (disambiguation)
Busting
Bustino
Mouth Moods, a music album with a track named "Bustin'"